Ledu District is a district of the city of Haidong, Qinghai province, China. Nearby are Ping'an District and the city of Xining. Ledu used to be named Nianbo county before 1929. The county dates back to 1724. On 8 February 2013 Ledu was upgraded from a county into a district.

Ledu District is served by the G6 Beijing–Lhasa Expressway.

See also 
 Liuwan Museum of Ancient Painted Pottery

References

External links 
 Map of Ledu, Qinghai, China from Multimap
 Liuwan Tombs, the largest tombs of primitive China

County-level divisions of Qinghai
Haidong